La casa de los líos (in English, "The house of trouble") was a famous television show on TV channel A3 in Spain for 4 years, 1996 until 2000.

Roles
The main roles were of Arturo Fernández as Arturo Valdés, the sister, Lola Herrera, as Pilar Valdés and the nurse Florinda Chico. It was a comedy about an elderly but seductive scrounger who moves to his sister's house to help her with her four young daughters.

References

1990s Spanish comedy television series
2000s Spanish comedy television series
Antena 3 (Spanish TV channel) network series
1996 Spanish television series debuts
2000 Spanish television series endings